Abdülhamid Han (ex Cobalt Explorer) is a Turkey-flagged seventh-generation ultra deepwater drillship owned and operated by the Turkish Petroleum Corporation. She is Turkey's fourth drillship.

History
The US oil and gas company Vantage Drilling International ordered the construction of the drillship in 2013, and prepaid US$59.5 million. She was built in 2014 by Daewoo Shipbuilding & Marine Engineering (DSME) at its shipyard in Okpo, Geoje, South Korea, and christened Cobalt Explorer. In August 2015, the  construction deal was terminated by DSME due to contract breach by Vantage Drilling. The ship was worth about US$600 million at that time.

In May 2019, the Norwegian company Northern Drilling had an option to acquire Cobalt Explorer. The price of the ship had fallen to about US$350 million. She was renamed West Cobalt. However, the deal was cancelled in October the same year by the offshore driller due to fundamental breach of contract.

The state-owned oil and gas company,  the Turkish Petroleum Corporation, TPAO, purchased the  Bahamas-flagged  idle drillship in November 2021 to add her to its drillship fleet of three sixth-generation drillships. The vessel departed from Okpo Port, South Korea early March 2022, sailed to Turkey and arrived at the Port of Taşucu in Silifke, Mersin mid May the same year. She was painted red/white with a big crescent and star of the Turkish flag on her prow. Work on equipment installation, technical procedures and certification was carried out before her planned commissioning in early August 2022.

Name
The drillship is renamed in honor of Abdul Hamid II, the 34th Sultan of the Ottoman Empire, like the three other drillships of the TPAO, Fatih (Mehmed II, known as Fatih, the  "conqueror"), Yavuz (Selim I, known as yavuz, the "resolute") and Kanuni (Suleiman the Magnificent, known as Kanunî, the "lawgiver").

Characteristics
Abdülhamid Han is a seventh-generation, advanced technology drillship (one of five in the world). The ship can operate in rough sea conditions and drill into high-pressure gas reservoirs.

The ship has a crew of 200.

The ship's identification number is, MMSI Number 311021300 and the call sign is TCA7090.

Mission

See also
 Fatih (ex Deepsea Metro II), sister ship and Turkey's first drillship (2017)
 Yavuz (ex Deepsea Metro I), sister ship and Turkey's second drillship (2018)
 Kanuni (ex Sertao), Turkey's third drillship (2020)

References

Drillships
2014 ships
Ships built by Daewoo Shipbuilding & Marine Engineering
Ships built in Geoje
Ships of Turkey
Ministry of Energy and Natural Resources (Turkey)